A sealed server is a type of server which is designed to run without users logging in. This setup has several potential benefits over a traditional server:
 Stronger security. Since users do not log in, it is possible for a sealed server to use stronger authentication than a password mechanism.
 Transparency. Since files are not accessed directly, a sealed server can store its payload in any format, without the clients needing any information about this. 
 Less opportunity for user error. Since a user does not have full control over the files on the server, there is less opportunity for them to, for example, change the mode of a private file to be world-readable.

A sealed server is primarily useful for data-centric mechanisms such as email, and is unsuited to file-centric protocols such as FTP.

Servers (computing)